Geopsychrobacter is a genus of bacteria from the order Desulfuromonadales.

References

Further reading 
 
 
 
 

 

Desulfuromonadales
Bacteria genera